Eusebio Ramos Morales (born December 15, 1952) is a Puerto Rican born American prelate of the Roman Catholic Church.  He has been serving as bishop for the Diocese of Caguas in Puerto Rico since 2017.  He previously served as bishop of the Diocese of Fajardo-Humacao in Puerto Rico from 2008 to 2017

Biography

Early life 
Eusebio Ramos Morales was on December 15, 1952, in Maunabo, Puerto Rico.  He studied philosophy and theology in Bayamón Central University in  Bayamón, Puerto Richo.  He then attended St. Vincent de Paul Regional Seminary in Boynton Beach, Florida and the Pontifical Gregorian University in Rome. 

Ramos Morales was ordained to the priesthood for the Diocese of Caguas on June 3, 1983, by Bishop Enrique Hernández Rivera.

Bishop of Fajardo-Humacao
Ramos Morales was appointed by Pope Benedict XVI as the first bishop of the new Diocese of Fajardo-Humacao on March 11, 2008.   He was consecrated and installed by Archbishop Roberto González Nieves on May 31, 2008.  Bishops Rubén González Medina and Józef Wesołowski served as his co-consecrators.

Bishop of Caguas
On February 2, 2017, Pope Francis appointed Ramos Morales as bishop of the Diocese of Caguas. On February 26, 2017, he was installed as bishop.

See also

 Catholic Church hierarchy
 Catholic Church in the United States
 Historical list of the Catholic bishops of Puerto Rico
 Historical list of the Catholic bishops of the United States
 List of Catholic bishops of the United States
 Lists of patriarchs, archbishops, and bishops

References

External links

 Roman Catholic Diocese of Caguas (Official Site in Spanish)

Episcopal succession

 

1952 births
Living people
Pontifical Gregorian University alumni
People from Maunabo, Puerto Rico
St. Vincent de Paul Regional Seminary alumni
Bishops appointed by Pope Benedict XVI
21st-century Roman Catholic bishops in Puerto Rico
Puerto Rican Roman Catholic bishops
Roman Catholic bishops of Caguas
Roman Catholic bishops of Fajardo–Humacao